The 2009 Russian Premier League was the 18th season of the Russian football championship since the dissolution of the Soviet Union and 8th under the current Russian Premier League name. The season started on 14 March 2009 with a goalless draw between Amkar Perm and Rostov. The last matches were played on 29 November 2009. On 21 November 2009 Rubin Kazan successfully retained their champion's title.

Teams 
As in the previous season, 16 teams played in the 2009 season. After the 2008 season, Shinnik Yaroslavl and Luch-Energiya Vladivostok were relegated to the 2009 Russian First Division. They were replaced by Rostov and Kuban Krasnodar, the winners and runners up of the 2008 Russian First Division.

Venues 
Dynamo Moscow played their home games during the 2009 season at the new Arena Khimki, due to their Dynamo Stadium undergoing renovation work.

Personnel and kits

Managerial changes

League table

Results

Season statistics

Top goalscorers

Awards 
On 24 November 2009 Russian Football Union named its list of 33 top players:

Goalkeepers
  Igor Akinfeev (CSKA)
  Sergei Ryzhikov (Rubin)
  Vladimir Gabulov (Dynamo)

Right backs
  Aleksandr Anyukov (Zenit)
  Sergei Parshivlyuk (Spartak M.)
  Kirill Nababkin (Moscow)

Right-centre backs
  Roman Sharonov (Rubin)
  Vasili Berezutskiy (CSKA)
  Martin Jiránek (Spartak M.)

Left-centre backs
  Sergei Ignashevich (CSKA)
  César Navas (Rubin)
  Denis Kolodin (Dynamo)

Left backs
  Cristian Ansaldi (Rubin)
  Renat Yanbaev (Lokomotiv)
  Georgi Schennikov (CSKA)

Defensive midfielders
  Sergei Semak (Rubin)
  Igor Denisov (Zenit)
  Dmitri Khokhlov (Dynamo)

Right wingers
  Vladimir Bystrov (Spartak M. / Zenit)
  Miloš Krasić (CSKA)
  Aleksandr Samedov (Moscow)

Central midfielders
  Alex (Spartak M.)
  Alan Dzagoev (CSKA)
  Igor Semshov (Zenit)

Left wingers
  Konstantin Zyryanov (Zenit)
  Edgaras Česnauskis (Moscow)
  Aleksandr Ryazantsev (Rubin)

Right forwards
  Welliton (Spartak M.)
  Aleksandr Bukharov (Rubin)
  Fatih Tekke (Zenit)

Left forwards
  Alejandro Domínguez (Rubin)
  Aleksandr Kerzhakov (Dynamo)
  Dmitri Sychev (Lokomotiv)

Medal squads

See also 
 Russian First Division 2009
 Russian Cup 2008–09
 List of Russian football transfers summer 2009

References

External links 
 Official website 
 Russian Football Union 
 Official website 

2007
1
Russia
Russia